Sandinista! is the fourth studio album by the English punk rock band the Clash. It was released on 12 December 1980 as a triple album containing 36 tracks, with 6 songs on each side. It crosses various genres including funk, reggae, jazz, gospel, rockabilly, folk, dub, rhythm and blues, calypso, disco, and rap. For the first time, the band's traditional songwriting credits of Strummer and Jones were replaced by a generic credit to the Clash.  The band agreed to a decrease in album royalties in order to release the 3-LP at a low price.

The title refers to the Sandinistas in Nicaragua, and its catalogue number, 'FSLN1', refers to the abbreviation of the party's Spanish name, Frente Sandinista de Liberación Nacional.

Sandinista! was mostly well received, however, there was criticism towards the large size of the triple album.  Sandinista! is the lowest charting album for the Clash in their native United Kingdom. However, the album was influential in the punk rock movement with its experimental sound and was voted best album of the year in the Pazz & Jop critics poll in The Village Voice. In 2020 it was ranked number 323 on the Rolling Stone list of "The 500 Greatest Albums of All Time" and Slant Magazine listed the album at number 85 on its "Best Albums of the 1980s" list.

Background and recording
The album was recorded over most of 1980, in London, Manchester, Jamaica and New York. It was produced by the band (primarily Mick Jones and Joe Strummer), recorded and mixed by Bill Price, and engineered by Jeremy "Jerry" Green (Wessex Sound Studios), J. P. Nichols (Electric Lady Studios), Lancelot "Maxie" McKenzie (Channel One Studios), and Bill Price (Pluto + Power Station Studios). Dub versions of some of the songs and toasting was done by Mikey Dread, who had first worked with the band for their 1980 single "Bankrobber". With Sandinista! the band reached beyond punk and reggae into dub, rhythm and blues, calypso, gospel and other genres. The album clearly displays the influence of reggae musician and producer Lee "Scratch" Perry (who had worked with the band on their 1977 single "Complete Control" and who had opened some of the band's shows during its stand at Bond's in New York in 1980), with a dense, echo-filled sound on even the straight rock songs.

When recording began in New York, bass guitarist Paul Simonon was busy making a film called Ladies and Gentlemen, The Fabulous Stains, and he was replaced briefly by Ian Dury and the Blockheads bassist Norman Watt-Roy; this later caused some bad feeling when Watt-Roy and keyboard player Mickey Gallagher, a fellow Blockhead, claimed they were responsible for co-composing the song "The Magnificent Seven", as the song was based on a tune of theirs. Dread, too, was upset that he was not credited as the album's producer, although he was credited with "Version Mix". Other guests on the album include singer Ellen Foley (Jones' partner at the time), guitarist Ivan Julian formerly of the Voidoids, former Eddie and the Hot Rods member Lew Lewis, and Strummer's old friend and musical collaborator Tymon Dogg, who plays violin, sings on and wrote the track "Lose This Skin"; he later joined Strummer's band the Mescaleros. Gallagher's children also made appearances: his two sons, Luke and Ben, singing a version of "Career Opportunities" from the band's first album, and his daughter Maria singing a snippet of "The Guns of Brixton", from London Calling, at the end of the track "Broadway".

This is also the only Clash album on which all four members have a lead vocal. Drummer Topper Headon made a unique lead vocal contribution on the song "Ivan Meets G.I. Joe", and Simonon sings lead on "The Crooked Beat".

Release
According to Joe Strummer, the decision to release a triple-LP was their way of mocking CBS for resisting their desire to release London Calling as a double album, then releasing Bruce Springsteen's double album The River less than a year later. Strummer took pleasure in the abundance, saying "It was doubly outrageous. Actually, it was triply outrageous." Mick Jones said, "I always saw it as a record for people who were, like, on oil rigs. Or Arctic stations. People that weren't able to get to the record shops regularly."

The band's wish to release the album at a low price was also met with resistance, and they had to forgo any royalties on the first 200,000 copies sold in the UK and a 50% cut in royalties elsewhere.

Four singles were released from the Sandinista! sessions in the UK: "Bankrobber" (which did not appear on the album), "The Call Up", "Hitsville UK", and "The Magnificent Seven". A single disc promotional sampler called Sandinista Now! was sent to press and radio.  The side one track listing was "Police on My Back", "Somebody Got Murdered", "The Call Up", "Washington Bullets", "Ivan Meets G.I. Joe" and "Hitsville U.K.". The side two track listing was "Up in Heaven (Not Only Here)", "The Magnificent Seven", "The Leader", "Junco Partner", "One More Time" and "The Sound of Sinners".

The song "Washington Bullets" was lyricist Joe Strummer's most extensive—and most specific—political statement to date.  In it, Strummer name checks conflicts or controversies from around the world; namely in Chile, Nicaragua, Cuba, Afghanistan and Tibet.  (In reference to the first three, Strummer seems to side with what he sees as popular leftist movements or governments, while in the latter two, he sharply criticises the policy of Moscow's and Beijing's communist governments for what he sees as their imperialist actions).  The Rolling Stone review of Sandinista! calls "Washington Bullets", along with "The Equaliser" and "The Call Up", "the heart of the album".

The original, 3-disc vinyl release of Sandinista! included a tri-fold lyric sheet titled The Armagideon Times, no. 3 (a play on "Armagideon Time", the B-side from the single London Calling.) Armagideon Times, nos. 1 and 2 were Clash fanzines. The lyric sheet featured cartoons credited to Steve Bell, as well as hand-written (but still legible) lyrics of all the original songs.  The 2-CD release contains a facsimile of the lyric sheet considerably reduced in size.

The cover photo of the band was taken by Pennie Smith, in Camley Street, behind St Pancras railway station.

Reception

John Piccarella, in a review for Rolling Stone headlined "The Clash Drop the Big One", argued that in effect, the band said "to hell with Clash style, there's a world out there." Some critics have argued that the album would have worked better as a less-ambitious, smaller project, while Piccarella (in his Rolling Stone review) and others think of the album as a breakthrough that deserves comparison to the Beatles' "White Album". Robert Christgau wrote in The Village Voice, "If this is their worst—which it is, I think—they must be, er, the world's greatest rock and roll band".

The triple album was included in several "best of the year" critics' polls in 1981. It was voted first place in The Village Voices 1981 Pazz & Jop critics' poll. According to CMJ, Sandinista! was the second most-played album of 1981 on American college radio. Dave Marsh noted that it was a record whose topic was as many years ahead of its time as its sound. Alternative Press included Sandinista! on its 2000 list of the "10 Essential Political-Revolution Albums". In 2018, Sandinista! was ranked at number 144 on Pitchforks list of the 200 best albums of the 1980s. In 2020, the album was ranked at number 323 on Rolling Stones list of the 500 greatest albums of all time.

The Sandinista! Project, a tribute to the album featuring the Smithereens, Camper Van Beethoven, Jon Langford and Sally Timms (Mekons), Amy Rigby, Katrina Leskanich (of Katrina and the Waves), Wreckless Eric, Willie Nile, Matthew Ryan, Stew, Mark Cutler, Sex Clark Five, Sid Griffin & Coal Porters, Haale, the Blizzard of 78 featuring Mikey Dread, Ruby on the Vine, and many others, was released on 15 May 2007, on the 00:02:59 Records (a label named after a lyric from the Sandinista! song "Hitsville U.K.").  The album also features a collaboration by Soul Food and Mickey Gallagher on "Midnight Log".

Sandinista! is remembered as an important influence for the Chilean rock band Los Prisioneros. The band members discovered the album in the austral summer of 1981 through a special report in Radio Concierto. Jorge González recalls he found it "advanced" and "Martian" and that "it taught me to do music".

Track listing
The compact disc release has the first three sides on the first CD and the latter three sides on the second CD.

All lead vocals by Joe Strummer, except where noted.

Personnel

The Clash
 Joe Strummer – lead and backing vocals, guitar, keyboards
 Mick Jones – guitar, keyboards, lead and backing vocals
 Paul Simonon – bass guitar, backing vocals, lead vocals on "The Crooked Beat"
 Topper Headon – drums, lead vocals on "Ivan Meets G.I. Joe" and backing vocals in "The Sound of Sinners"

Additional musicians
 Tymon Dogg (credited as 'Timon Dogg') – vocals and violin on "Lose This Skin", violin on "Lightning Strikes (Not Once but Twice)", "Something About England", "Mensforth Hill", "Junco Partner" and "The Equaliser", keyboard on "The Sound of Sinners"
 Mickey Gallagher (Blockheads) – keyboards
 Norman Watt-Roy (Blockheads) – bass guitar on "The Magnificent Seven", "Hitsville UK", "One More Time", "Look Here", "Something About England", "The Call Up", "Lose This Skin", "Charlie Don't Surf", and "Lightning Strikes (Not Once but Twice)"
 J.P. Nicholson - bass guitar
 Ellen Foley – co-lead vocal on "Hitsville U.K.", backing vocals on "Corner Soul" and "Washington Bullets"
 Davey Payne (Blockheads) – saxophone on "Ivan Meets G.I. Joe", "Something About England", "The Crooked Beat", "If Music Could Talk", "Lose This Skin" and "Mensforth Hill"
 Rick Gascoigne – trombone on "Ivan Meets G.I. Joe", "Something About England", "Lose This Skin", "Mensforth Hill" and "The Street Parade"
 Band Sgt. Dave Yates – drill sergeant on "The Call Up" 
 Den Hegarty (Darts) – vocals on "The Sound of Sinners"
 Luke & Ben Gallagher – vocals on "Career Opportunities"
 Maria Gallagher – coda vocals on "Broadway" (singing "The Guns of Brixton")
 Gary Barnacle – saxophone on "Ivan Meets G.I. Joe", "Something About England", "The Crooked Beat", "Lose This Skin", "Mensforth Hill" and "The Street Parade" 
 Arthur Edward "Bill" Barnacle (Gary's father) – trumpet on "Ivan Meets G.I. Joe", "Something About England", "Lose This Skin" and "The Street Parade" 
 Jody Linscott – percussion
 Ivan Julian (Voidoids) – guitar on "The Call Up"
 Noel "Tempo" Bailey (aka Sowell, reggae artist/session man) – guitar
 Anthony Nelson Steelie (Wycliffe Johnson of Steely and Clevie) – keyboards
 Lew Lewis (Eddie and the Hot Rods) – harmonica on "Junco Partner", "Look Here", "Corner Soul", "Midnight Log", "The Equaliser", "Version City" and "Version Pardner" 
 Gerald Baxter-Warman
 Terry McQuade (had a small role in Rude Boy)
 Rudolph Adolphus Jordan
 Battersea (Topper Headon's dog) – barking on "Somebody Got Murdered"
 Mikey Dread – vocals on "The Crooked Beat", "One More Time", "Living in Fame" and "Look Here"
 Style Scott – drums on "Junco Partner" and "Version Pardner"

Production

 The Clash – producers
 Bill Price – chief engineer
 Jerry Green – engineer
 J. P. Nicholson – engineer
 Lancelot "Maxie" McKenzie – engineer
 Mark Freegard – assistant engineer
 Mikey Dread – version mix
 Pennie Smith – photography
 Steve Bell – cartoonist

Charts

Certifications

References

Further reading

External links

Sandinista! at the Clash official website.
Song Histories: Junco Partner at Everyday Companion Online

1980 albums
The Clash albums
Dub albums
Epic Records albums
Albums recorded at Electric Lady Studios
Sandinista National Liberation Front
Nicaraguan Revolution